John Matthew Moore (November 18, 1862 – February 3, 1940) was an American rancher and statesman from Texas who served in the United States House of Representatives from District 8 from 1905 to 1913.

Moore was appointed Secretary of State of Texas by Governor Sul Ross on January 21, 1887 at the age of 25. He served throughout Governor Ross's term.  Moore was elected a member of the Texas House of Representatives in 1896.

Moore's son, John Jr., served as a two-term Mayor of Richmond, Texas and a two-term judge in Fort Bend County, Texas.  John Jr.'s son, Hilmar, was the Mayor of Richmond, and the longest-serving elected official in the United States, having served 30 terms from 1949 until Moore's death on December 4, 2012.

See also
John M. and Lottie D. Moore House

References

External links

1862 births
1940 deaths
Secretaries of State of Texas
Democratic Party members of the Texas House of Representatives
Texas A&M University alumni
People from Richmond, Texas
Democratic Party members of the United States House of Representatives from Texas